Manjate is a surname. Notable people with the surname include:
Apson Manjate (born 1985), Mozambican footballer
Armandinho Manjate (born 1970), Brazilian footballer and manager
Rogério Manjate (born 1972), Mozambican actor, director, and filmmaker
Mozambican surnames

Bantu-language surnames